Gabriel Chukwuwunzo Melkam (born 13 March 1980) is a Nigerian former professional footballer who played as a left back or midfielder.

Club career
In April 2007, Melkam was banned three matches and fined 5000 RMB for misconduct for showing "All Referee of Chinese Super League were cheat." on his T-shirt after the match against Henan Jianye, to revenge the serious mistake of referee on the match Xiamen Lanshi against Shanghai Shenhua.

Melkam transferred to Guangzhou Evergrande in 2010. He made his China League One debut for Guangzhou against Beijing BIT on 3 April.

International career
Melkam finished runner-up at the 1999 African Youth Championship and  quarter-finalist at 1999 FIFA World Youth Championship. Melkam was included in the Nigerian squad for the 2006 FIFA World Cup qualifier in Zimbabwe on 5 September. The tie marked the debut of the then-Hansa Rostock defender Melkam, who narrowly missed out on a place in Nigeria's 2004 Cup of Nations squad.

Personal life
Melkam's younger brother Innocent Melkam played football in the German lower leagues.

Honours
Guangzhou Evergrande
China League One: 2010

References

External links
 

1980 births
Living people
Nigerian footballers
Nigeria under-20 international footballers
Stationery Stores F.C. players
Kwara United F.C. players
SG Wattenscheid 09 players
Karlsruher SC players
FC Hansa Rostock players
Sportfreunde Siegen players
Association football fullbacks
Xiamen Blue Lions players
Changchun Yatai F.C. players
Guangzhou F.C. players
Qingdao Hainiu F.C. (1990) players
Chinese Super League players
China League One players
Bundesliga players
2. Bundesliga players
Nigerian expatriate footballers
Nigerian expatriate sportspeople in Germany
Expatriate footballers in Germany
Nigerian expatriate sportspeople in China
Expatriate footballers in China